James Downie was a 19th-century footballer who played for Blackburn Rovers and Burslem Port Vale.

Career
Downie played for Blackburn Rovers before joining Burslem Port Vale in October 1895. He made his debut at outside-left in an 8–2 thumping at Darwen on 19 October; he was described as "absolutely useless" before it was revealed he was right-footed. Two days later he scored his first goal in the Football League, in a 5–4 victory over Liverpool at the Athletic Ground. He became a regular in his natural position before losing his place in March 1896 and getting released at the end of the season with two goals in 12 Second Division appearances.

Career statistics
Source:

References

Year of birth missing
Year of death missing
English footballers
Association football wingers
Blackburn Rovers F.C. players
Port Vale F.C. players
English Football League players